Camuzzi Gas is an Argentine natural gas distribution company that through its subsidiaries, Camuzzi Gas Pampeana (in a part of the Buenos Aires Province and all La Pampa Province) and Camuzzi Gas del Sur un the following provinces Neuquén, Chubut, Río Negro, Santa Cruz and Tierra del Fuego; covers 45% of the country's concession areas, serving 2 million customers.

References 

Companies based in Buenos Aires